Riverton Collegiate Institute (or RCI) is a high school located in Riverton, Manitoba in the Rural Municipality of Bifrost in the Interlake Region, Manitoba.

Riverton Collegiate has an enrollment of about 150 students from grade 9 to Senior 4, and is part of Evergreen School Division. The school enjoys a close working relationship with all of these communities, including partners from Southeast Tribal Counci, Bloodvein First Nation, Berens River First Nation, Poplar River First Nation, Frontier School Division. Sapotaweyak Cree Nation (Pelican Rapids, and Kinonjeoshtegon First Nation (Jackhead). In 2009 Riverton Collegiate began a band program and choral choir.

External links
 Riverton Collegiate Institute

High schools in Manitoba
Educational institutions in Canada with year of establishment missing